Firuz Kola-ye Olya (also Romanized as Fīrūz Kolā-ye ‘Olyā) is a village in Dasht-e Sar Rural District, Dabudasht District, Amol County, Mazandaran Province, Iran. At the 2006 census, its population was 371, in 101 families.

References 

Populated places in Amol County